The present-day Department of Amazonas in Peru, occupying part of the western Amazon basin, carries evidence of human cultures predating the Inca Empire. The presence of the Chachapoya culture and the Wari culture in architectural excavations allow for evidence of multiple civilized presences previous to the conquest of the area by the Incan Empire.

Prehistoric
Prehistoric evidence on rocky walls includes the rock paintings of Chiñuña-Yamón and Limones-Calpón in the province of Utcubamba. Some of these pictorial samples were made by people who had a hunting economy six to seven thousand years ago.

By the time the Peruvian civilization was already formed, there appeared a type of ceramic mainly identified in Bagua Province.

Historic
The Wari (Huari) were present and occupants of the southern region of the modern day Amazonas Department of Peru, from CE 500 to CE 1000, around 500 years prior to the founding of the Inca Empire. Similar to the Inca Empire, the Huari also expanded across more territories than their other pre-Inca neighbors to the South, the Moche and Chimú. The Huari are theorized to be the pioneers of terrace agriculture, a farming system suited to the topographical terrain of Peru that later would revolutionize European agriculture.

The architectural remains of the Huari that date their presence in the state of Peru, pre-Inca establishment, include the Wari Complex (Huari Complex), a site of 988 acres thought to home up to 40,000 people. Near the city of Ayacucho, the site includes subterranean galleries, mausoleums of human remains, and astronomical tables.

There are also many architectural remains from the Chachapoya culture, some of which are Kuelap, Gran Vilaya, Cerro Olán, Purum Llaqta, Cheto, and Gran Pajatén. All of these structures appear to be related, but their age and order of construction are unknown.

See also
Extinct languages of the Marañón River basin

References

Amazonas Region
History of indigenous peoples of South America
Andean civilizations